The Manitoba Métis Federation (MMF) is a federally recognized Métis organization provincially incorporated in Manitoba, Canada, on 28 December 1967. Its current president is David Chartrand. In September of 2021, the MMF withdrew from the Métis National Council, due to that organization's failure to uphold the 2002 nationally accepted definition of Métis.

Leadership

The first non-elected Board of Directors was Adam Cuthand, Joe Keeper and Alfred Disbrowe.

The successive presidents of the MMF have been the following.

Activities 
During the COVID-19 pandemic, MMF received a $460,200 grant from the Public Health Agency of Canada's Immunization Partnership Fund to increase acceptance of COVID-19 vaccines among Métis citizens in Manitoba.

Further reading

 Barkwell, Lawrence J., Leah Dorion, and Audreen Hourie. Métis legacy Michif culture, heritage, and folkways. Métis legacy series, v. 2. Saskatoon: Gabriel Dumont Institute, 2006. 
Barkwell, Lawrence J., Leah Dorion and Darren Prefontaine. "Metis Legacy: A Historiography and Annotated Bibliography". Winnipeg: Pemmican Publications Inc. and Saskatoon: Gabriel Dumont Institute, 2001. 
 Chartrand, Paul L. A. H. Manitoba's Métis Settlement Scheme of 1870. Saskatoon: Native Law Centre, University of Saskatchewan, 1991. 
 Flanagan, Thomas. Metis Lands in Manitoba. Calgary: University of Calgary Press, 1991. 
 McFee, Janice. Famous Manitoba Métis. Winnipeg: Manitoba Métis Federation Press, 1974.
 Morrison, Sheila Jones. Rotten to the Core The Politics of the Manitoba Métis Federation. Victoria, B.C.: 101060, 1995. 
 Pelletier, E. A Social History of the Manitoba Métis. Winnipeg: Manitoba Métis Federation Press, 1977. 
 Sawchuk, Joe. The Metis of Manitoba Reformulation of an Ethnic Identity. Toronto: P. Martin Associates, 1978. 
 Sealey, D. Bruce. Statutory Land Rights of the Manitoba Metis. Winnipeg, Man: Manitoba Métis Federation Press, 1975.
 Sealey, D. Bruce. Education of the Manitoba Metis An Historical Sketch. Winnipeg: Dept. of Education, Native Education Branch, 1977.
 St-Onge, Nicole J. M. Saint-Laurent, Manitoba Evolving Métis Identities, 1850-1914. Canadian plains studies, 45. Regina: Canadian Plains Research Center, University of Regina, 2004. 

Indigenous rights organizations
Non-profit organizations based in Manitoba
Métis organizations
1967 establishments in Manitoba

References 
 
Indigenous organizations in Manitoba